Chem may refer to:
Chemistry 
Chemical
Chem (journal), a scientific journal published by Cell Press
Post apocalyptic slang for "drugs", medicinal or otherwise in the Fallout video game series. 

In Ancient Egyptian usage:
Khem (also spelt Chem), the Egyptian word for "black"
Min (god), in the past erroneously named Khem

CHEM may refer to :
A metabolic panel: for instance, CHEM-7, which is the basic metabolic panel
CHEM-DT, a Canadian television channel

See also
Chemo (disambiguation)
Kemi, a place in Finland